Oksana Alexandrovna Kostina (15 April 1972 – 11 February 1993) was a Soviet and Russian individual rhythmic gymnast. She was the 1992 World All-around champion and 1992 European All-around bronze medalist.

Career 
For years, Kostina remained in the shadow of two Ukrainian gymnasts, Oksana Skaldina and Olexandra Tymoshenko. Though she won the all-around bronze medal at the 1992 European Championships, she was not selected for the Olympic Games in Barcelona. Kostina and her coach, Olga Buyanova, frustrated by what they felt was the Unified Team's favoritism toward Skaldina, traveled to Barcelona and Kostina trained with the British team for a short time before the Russian Federation ordered her home.

In the absence of the two Ukrainian gymnasts, Kostina won the All-around gold medal, as well as gold medals in rope, hoop, ball and clubs at the 1992 World Championships in Brussels. Her goal was to compete at the 1996 Summer Olympics in Atlanta.

Death 
Kostina died in a car crash on 11 February 1993 in Moscow, a few weeks shy of her 21st birthday.
She was engaged to Eduard Zenovka, Pentathlon bronze-medalist at the Olympic Games in Barcelona. A lorry that was driving in the opposite direction crashed head-on into their vehicle. Both athletes were seriously injured and needed surgery in hospital. Sixteen hours later, Kostina died from injuries sustained at the car crash. The police investigation revealed that Zenovka, who was driving the car, was heavily intoxicated at the time of the accident.

Achievements 
Kostina was one of the few gymnasts to win gold medals in all of the apparatus in a single World Championship, along with Bianka Panova, Ekaterina Serebrianskaya and Evgenia Kanaeva.

References

External links
 
 Oksana Kostina at r-gymnastics.com 

1972 births
1993 deaths
Sportspeople from Irkutsk
Road incident deaths in Russia
Russian rhythmic gymnasts
Soviet rhythmic gymnasts
Medalists at the Rhythmic Gymnastics World Championships
Goodwill Games medalists in gymnastics
Competitors at the 1990 Goodwill Games